The 1968 Presidential Cup was the third edition of the Turkish Super Cup. No match was played, since Fenerbahçe won the 1967–68 Turkish League and 1967–68 Turkish Cup and thus were awarded the trophy by the Turkish Football Federation.

See also
 1967–68 1.Lig
 1967–68 Turkish Cup

References

1968
Turkish Super Cup
Presidential Cup 1968